The High Commissioner of South Africa to the United Kingdom is an officer of the South African Department of International Relations and Cooperation and the head of the High Commission of the Republic of South Africa to the United Kingdom in London. The position has the rank and status of an Ambassador Extraordinary and Plenipotentiary and also serves as South Africa's Permanent Representative to the International Maritime Organization (since 1959), a Trustee of the Imperial War Museum and South Africa's Commonwealth War Graves Commissioner.

The High Commissioner is currently Jeremiah Nyamane Mamabolo. On South Africa's departure from the Commonwealth of Nations in 1961, the High Commission became an Embassy. Following the end of Apartheid and South Africa's return to the Commonwealth on 1 June 1994, the High Commission was re-established to replace the former Embassy.

Office-holders

High Commissioners from the Union of South Africa, 1910–61

Ambassadors from the Republic of South Africa, 1961–94

High Commissioners from the Republic of South Africa, 1994–date

See also

South Africa–United Kingdom relations
List of high commissioners of the United Kingdom to South Africa

References

External links
South African High Commission, London

United Kingdom
South Africa
South Africa and the Commonwealth of Nations
United Kingdom and the Commonwealth of Nations